Mount Valkyrie is a dolerite-capped peak on the south wall of Wright Valley, separating Bartley Glacier and Meserve Glacier in the Asgard Range of Victoria Land. It was named by the Victoria University of Wellington Antarctic Expedition (VUWAE), 1958–59, after the Valkyries of Norse mythology.

Mountains of the Asgard Range
McMurdo Dry Valleys